Coleophora lessinica is a moth of the family Coleophoridae. It is found in France, Italy, Croatia, Hungary and North Macedonia.

References

lessinica
Moths of Europe